Lister is a river of North Rhine-Westphalia, Germany.It is a tributary of the Bigge.

See also
List of rivers of North Rhine-Westphalia

References

Rivers of North Rhine-Westphalia
Rivers of Germany